David Longfen Ji is an American businessman who co-founded Apex Digital, an electronics manufacturer.

In 2004, he was arrested in China following a dispute with Sichuan Changhong Electric, a supplier owned by the city of Mianyang and the province of Sichuan. Changhong accused him of defrauding them through bad checks. Ji was taken, according to an account by his lawyer, to the senior management and told, "I decide whether you live or die." He has been held in China without charges.

Ji's case highlighted an "implicit racism" in dealings with American businessmen. As a U.S. citizen he was not granted the same treatment by authorities as non-ethnically Chinese businessmen sharing the same nationality.

References 

Living people
American people of Chinese descent
21st-century American businesspeople
Year of birth missing (living people)
American manufacturing businesspeople
American technology company founders
American people imprisoned abroad
Prisoners and detainees of the People's Republic of China